Sam Temple (born 25 January 1972) is a British freestyle skier. He competed at the 1998 Winter Olympics and the 2002 Winter Olympics.

References

External links
 

1972 births
Living people
British male freestyle skiers
Olympic freestyle skiers of Great Britain
Freestyle skiers at the 1998 Winter Olympics
Freestyle skiers at the 2002 Winter Olympics
Sportspeople from Oxford